Interline may refer to:
 Interlineation in law
 Interlining, itineraries that use more than one airline
 Interline travel, also in airlines
 Freight interline system, for freight transport
 Interline spacing in typography
 Interline twitter in interlaced displays

Companies 
 Interline Brands
 Interline Bus Services
 Interliner, Dutch express bus service
 Interlinear